The 2008 season was the Arizona Cardinals' 89th in the National Football League (NFL), their 21st season in Arizona, and their second under head coach Ken Whisenhunt. The season marked the Cardinals' first Super Bowl appearance, coming as a result of their victory against the Philadelphia Eagles in the NFC Championship. The Cardinals slogan for the season was "Shock The World!" Riding the back of quarterback Kurt Warner, who had gone from being a backup for the St. Louis Rams in 1999 to leading the Greatest Show on Turf to a Super Bowl XXXIV victory, and franchise wide receiver Larry Fitzgerald, the Cardinals went on a playoff run for the ages after having won just one playoff game in the last sixty years, as Warner once again recreated the magic he had captured with the Rams. (Coincidentally, both teams were based in St. Louis at one point or another, only to relocate to different cities.)

The Cardinals began their season by compiling a 7–3 record by Week 11 and finished the regular season with a 9–7 record, which was good enough to win the NFC West, and the Cardinals, for the first time since 1947, hosted a playoff game. In that wild card game, the Cardinals defeated the Atlanta Falcons. The next week, for the Divisional round of the playoffs, the Cardinals traveled to Charlotte, North Carolina, where they upset the number 2 seeded Carolina Panthers. Then, because the Philadelphia Eagles also achieved an upset the same week (against the top-seeded New York Giants), the number-four seed Cardinals hosted the NFC Championship game, where they defeated the Eagles and qualified for the Super Bowl for the first time in franchise history. In Super Bowl XLIII, the Cardinals' winning streak ended. Though they led the Pittsburgh Steelers with less than a minute left to play in the game, they lost, 23–27.

The 2008 Cardinals were the second 9–7 team to reach the Super Bowl, joining the Los Angeles Rams in Super Bowl XIV, who also lost to the Steelers; however, the Rams had to win only two playoff games, rather than three, to reach the Super Bowl. Three years later in Super Bowl XLVI, the New York Giants would become the first 9–7 team to win, overshadowing the Cardinals' achievement. In 2014, Athlon Sports ranked the 2008 Cardinals as the fourth-worst team to ever make the Super Bowl.

Coaching staff

2008 NFL Draft selections

Roster

Schedule

Preseason

Regular season

Standings

Regular season results

Week 1: at San Francisco 49ers

The Cardinals began their 2008 campaign on the road against their NFC West rival, the San Francisco 49ers. In the first quarter, Arizona took flight as kicker Neil Rackers got a 25-yard field goal. The 49ers responded with RB Frank Gore's 41-yard TD run. In the second quarter, the Cardinals responded with QB Kurt Warner completing a one-yard TD pass to WR Larry Fitzgerald, yet San Francisco tied the game with kicker Joe Nedney getting a 39-yard field goal. In the third quarter, the Cardinals began to soar as Rackers got a 31-yard field goal, along with rookie RB Tim Hightower getting a two-yard TD run. In the fourth quarter, the 49ers tried to respond with Nedney getting a 30-yard field goal. Afterwards, Rackers' 30-yard field goal sealed the victory for Arizona.

With the win, the Cardinals began their season at 1–0.

Week 2: vs. Miami Dolphins

Coming off their divisional road win over the 49ers, the Cardinals played their Week 2 home opener against the Miami Dolphins. In the first quarter, the Cardinals scored first as QB Kurt Warner threw 2 touchdown passes (a 79-yarder and a three-yarder) to WR Anquan Boldin. In the second quarter, Arizona increased their lead with a 45-yard field goal by Neil Rackers. In the third quarter, the Cardinals increased its lead to 24–0 with rookie running back Tim Hightower getting a one-yard touchdown run. In the process, he became the first Cardinals rookie running back to score in each of his first two games. The Dolphins finally got on the board when kicker Dan Carpenter nailed a 32-yard field goal. The Cardinals replied with Warner and Boldin hooking up with each other for a third time on an eight-yard touchdown pass. In the fourth quarter, Miami tried to rally as running back Ronnie Brown got a one-yard TD run, but Arizona held on for a dominating win.

With the win, the Cardinals improved to its first 2–0 start since 1991. This game was also one of three times that Kurt Warner finished a game with a perfect passer rating.

Week 3: at Washington Redskins

Coming off their home win over the Dolphins, the Cardinals flew to FedExField for a Week 3 duel with the Washington Redskins. In the first quarter, Arizona trailed early as Redskins RB Clinton Portis got a three-yard TD run. In the second quarter, the Cardinals continued to trail as kicker Shaun Suisham got a 48-yard field goal. The Cardinals would end the half with QB Kurt Warner completing a four-yard TD pass to WR Anquan Boldin. In the third quarter, the Cardinals tied the game with kicker Neil Rackers nailing a 26-yard field goal, yet Washington responded with QB Jason Campbell completing a two-yard TD pass to TE Todd Yoder. Afterwards, Arizona answered with Warner completing a 62-yard TD pass to WR Larry Fitzgerald. However, in the fourth quarter, the Redskins pulled away with Campbell's 17-yard TD pass to WR Santana Moss.

With the loss, the Cardinals fell to 2–1.

Week 4: at New York Jets

Hoping to rebound from their road loss to the Redskins, the Cardinals flew to The Meadowlands for a Week 4 interconference duel with the New York Jets. After a scoreless first quarter, Arizona started to trail big in the second quarter. The Jets took flight with QB Brett Favre completing a 12-yard TD pass to WR Laveranues Coles, CB Darrelle Revis returning an interception 32 yards for a touchdown, Favre completing a 34-yard TD pass to Coles, kicker Jay Feely getting 20-yard field goal, Favre completing a two-yard TD pass to Coles, and Feely kicking a 30-yard field goal.

In the third quarter, the Cardinals responded with RB Edgerrin James getting a four-yard and a two-yard TD run, along with rookie RB Tim Hightower getting a one-yard TD run. In the fourth quarter, New York answered with Favre's 17-yard TD pass to WR Jerricho Cotchery. The Cardinals would reply with QB Kurt Warner completing an eight-yard TD pass to WR Anquan Boldin, yet the Jets continued their victory march with Favre's 40-yard TD pass to Cotchery. Arizona tried to rally as Warner completed a 14-yard TD pass to WR Jerheme Urban, but New York sealed the win with Favre's 24-yard TD pass to TE Dustin Keller.

The Jets only had 373 yards of total offense compared to the Cardinals' 468, but the Cardinals committed seven turnovers during the game, with Warner throwing three interceptions and losing three fumbles, while Boldin lost another fumble.

With the loss, the Cardinals fell to 2–2.

Week 5: vs. Buffalo Bills

Hoping to rebound from their miserable road loss to the Jets, the Cardinals went home for a Week 5 interconference duel with the Buffalo Bills. In the first quarter, the Cardinals took flight as QB Kurt Warner completed a two-yard TD pass to WR Larry Fitzgerald. In the second quarter, Arizona increased its lead with rookie RB Tim Hightower getting a 17-yard TD run. The Bills responded with QB J. P. Losman completing an 87-yard TD pass to WR Lee Evans, yet the Cardinals answered right back with RB Edgerrin James getting a one-yard TD run. Buffalo would answer with Losman getting a two-yard TD run, yet the Cardinals continued its momentum with kicker Neil Rackers getting a 47-yard field goal.

In the third quarter, the Bills tried to come back as kicker Rian Lindell got a 48-yard field goal, but Arizona kept its intensity up as Warner completed a two-yard TD pass to Fitzgerald. In the fourth quarter, the Cardinals pulled away as Rackers nailed a 38-yard field goal, along with Hightower getting a two-yard TD run.

With the win, the Cardinals improved to 3–2.

Week 6: vs. Dallas Cowboys

Coming off their rout over the Bills, the Cardinals stayed at home for a crucial Week 6 showdown with the Dallas Cowboys. In the first quarter, the Cardinals immediately took flight as RB J. J. Arrington returned the game's opening kickoff 93 yards for a touchdown. In the second quarter, the Cowboys tied the game as QB Tony Romo completed a 55-yard TD pass to WR Patrick Crayton. In the third quarter, Dallas took the lead with Romo completing a 14-yard TD pass to WR Miles Austin. Arizona would tie the game with QB Kurt Warner completing a two-yard TD pass to WR Larry Fitzgerald. In the fourth quarter, the Cardinals regained the lead as Warner completed an 11-yard TD pass to WR Steve Breaston, along with kicker Neil Rackers getting a 41-yard field goal. However, the Cowboys tied the game as Romo completed a 70-yard TD pass to RB Marion Barber, along with kicker Nick Folk nailing a 52-yard field goal. In overtime, after forcing a three-and-out, Arizona got the win as WR Sean Morey blocked a Mat McBriar punt attempt, allowing LB Monty Beisel to return it 3 yards for the game-winning touchdown. McBriar would end up with his foot fractured and put on the IR by the Cowboys.

With the impressive win, the Cardinals entered their bye week at 4–2.

In the NFL's 423rd recorded overtime game, this was the first game to end with a blocked punt getting returned for a touchdown.

Week 8: at Carolina Panthers

Coming off their bye week, the Cardinals flew to Bank of America Stadium for a Week 8 duel with the Carolina Panthers. In the first quarter, the Cardinals took flight as kicker Neil Rackers got a 21-yard field goal. In the second quarter, Arizona increased its lead as QB Kurt Warner completed a five-yard TD pass to WR Anquan Boldin. The Panthers closed out the half with kicker John Kasay getting a 23-yard field goal.

In the third quarter, the Cardinals increased their lead as rookie RB Tim Hightower got a two-yard TD run. However, Carolina began to rally as RB DeAngelo Williams got a 15-yard TD run, while QB Jake Delhomme completed an 18-yard TD pass to WR Steve Smith. The Cardinals replied with Warner hooking up with Boldin again on a two-yard TD pass (with a failed PAT), but the Panthers took the lead on Delhomme's 65-yard TD pass to Smith. In the fourth quarter, Carolina pulled away as Kasay nailed a 50-yard field goal.

With the tough loss, the Cardinals fell to 4–3.

Week 9: at St. Louis Rams

Hoping to rebound from their road loss to the Panthers, the Cardinals flew to the Edward Jones Dome for a Week 9 NFC West duel with the St. Louis Rams. In the first quarter, Arizona trailed early as Rams QB Marc Bulger completed an 80-yard TD pass to WR Derek Stanley. In the second quarter, the Cardinals took flight as Safety Antrel Rolle returned an interception 40 yards for a touchdown, kicker Neil Rackers got a 36-yard field goal, rookie RB Tim Hightower got a 30-yard TD run, and former Rams QB Kurt Warner completed a 56-yard TD pass to WR Jerheme Urban.

In the third quarter, the Cardinals continued their domination as Warner completed a seven-yard TD pass to WR Anquan Boldin. In the fourth quarter, St. Louis tried to rally as Bulger completed a three-yard TD pass to WR Torry Holt (with a failed two-point conversion). Fortunately, Arizona pulled away as Rackers nailed a 30-yard field goal.

With the win, the Cardinals improved to 5–3.

Week 10: vs. San Francisco 49ers

Coming off their divisional road win over the Rams, the Cardinals went home for a Week 10 NFC West rematch with the San Francisco 49ers on Monday Night Football. In the first quarter, Arizona trailed early as 49ers CB Allen Rossum returned the game's opening kickoff 104 yards for a touchdown. The Cardinals would respond as kicker Neil Rackers got a 28-yard field goal. In the second quarter, San Francisco added onto their lead as QB Shaun Hill completed a 31-yard TD pass to WR Josh Morgan. The Cardinals would answer with QB Kurt Warner completing a 13-yard TD pass to WR Anquan Boldin, along with Rackers getting a 33-yard field goal. The 49ers would close out the half with Hill completing an 18-yard TD pass to TE Vernon Davis.

In the third quarter, Arizona crept closer again as Warner completed a five-yard TD pass to WR Larry Fitzgerald, yet San Francisco replied with kicker Joe Nedney getting a 41-yard field goal. In the fourth quarter, the Cardinals took the lead as Rackers nailed a 23-yard field goal, along with Warner hooking up with Boldin again on a five-yard TD pass (with a failed two-point conversion.) The 49ers would mount a late comeback drive, but Arizona made a successful goal-line stand as time ran out.

With the win, the Cardinals improved to 6–3.

Week 11: at Seattle Seahawks

Coming off their close MNF home win over the 49ers, the Cardinals flew to Qwest Field for a Week 11 NFC West duel with the Seattle Seahawks. In the first quarter, the Cardinals took flight as kicker Neil Rackers got a 38-yard field goal, along with RB J. J. Arrington getting a four-yard TD run. In the second quarter, Arizona increased its lead with Rackers making a 48-yard field goal. The Seahawks answered with QB Matt Hasselbeck completing a 13-yard TD pass to RB Maurice Morris. The Cardinals would close out the half with Rackers getting a 54-yard field goal.

In the third quarter, the Cardinals increased their lead as Rackers nailed a 26-yard field goal and QB Kurt Warner completed a six-yard TD pass to Arrington. In the fourth quarter, Seattle tried to rally as RB T. J. Duckett got a one-yard TD run (with a failed two-point conversion) and a two-yard TD run. Fortunately, rookie CB Dominique Rodgers-Cromartie came up with the game-winning interception.

With the win, not only did the Cardinals win three straight for the first time since 2002, but they improved to 7–3 for the first time since 1977.

Week 12: vs. New York Giants

Coming off their divisional road win over the Seahawks, the Cardinals went home for a Week 12 duel with the defending Super Bowl champions, the New York Giants. In the first quarter, Arizona took fight as kicker Neil Rackers got a 34-yard field goal. In the second quarter, the Giants responded with RB Derrick Ward getting a one-yard TD run. The Cardinals would regain the lead with rookie RB Tim Hightower getting a four-yard TD run (with a failed extra-point attempt), yet New York answered with kicker John Carney getting a 33-yard field goal. The Cardinals would reply with Rackers making a 20-yard field goal, yet the Giants closed out the half with QB Eli Manning completing a 12-yard TD pass to WR Amani Toomer.

In the third quarter, New York increased their lead as Manning completed a two-yard TD pass to FB Madison Hedgecock. Arizona would answer with Hightower getting a one-yard TD run. In the fourth quarter, the Giants were starting to pull away as Manning completed a 10-yard TD pass to TE Kevin Boss, while Carney made a 27-yard field goal. The Cardinals tried to keep pace as QB Kurt Warner completed a five-yard TD pass to WR Anquan Boldin, yet New York replied with Carney's 33-yard field goal. Arizona tried to come back as Rackers nailed a 44-yard field goal, but their following onside kick failed, preserving the Giants' win.

With the loss, the Cardinals fell to 7–4.

Week 13: at Philadelphia Eagles

Hoping to rebound from their tough home loss to the Giants, the Cardinals flew to Lincoln Financial Field for a Week 13 Thanksgiving battle with the Philadelphia Eagles. In the first quarter, Arizona trailed early as Eagles QB Donovan McNabb completed a five-yard TD pass to RB Brian Westbrook, while Westbrook got a one-yard TD run. In the second quarter, the Cardinals continued to trail as McNabb hooked up with Westbrook again on a two-yard TD pass. The Cardinals would respond as QB Kurt Warner completed a one-yard TD pass to WR Larry Fitzgerald. Philadelphia would close out the half with kicker David Akers making a 42-yard field goal.

In the third quarter, Arizona's struggles continued as Westbrook got a nine-yard TD run. The Cardinals would answer with Warner completed a six-yard TD pass to WR Steve Breaston (with a failed two-point conversion.) The Eagles would reply as Akers got a 41-yard field goal. In the fourth quarter, the Cardinals tried to rally as Warner hooked up with Fitzgerald again on a seven-yard TD pass. However, Philadelphia replied with McNabb completing a 5-yard TD pass to WR DeSean Jackson, along with an eight-yard TD pass to WR Jason Avant.

With the loss, the Cardinals fell to 7–5.

Week 14: vs. St. Louis Rams

Arizona dominated St Louis to win the NFC West and clinch their first home playoff game since 1947. Arizona took a 14–0 lead in the first quarter after a one-yard TD run by Tim Hightower and a Kurt Warner 12-yard TD pass to Larry Fitzgerald. In the second quarter the Rams would score on a three-yard TD pass from Marc Bulger to Steven Jackson, following a Kurt Warner interception. The Cardinals would respond with two field goals from Neil Rackers from 44 and 22 yards to make the halftime score 20–7. In the third quarter, Cardinals linebacker, Gerald Hayes, would force two Steven Jackson fumbles, the second one recovered by Darnell Dockett, who would return it 11 yards to the end zone for a touchdown. Down 27–7, the Rams attempted to come back in the fourth quarter, starting with a Josh Brown 51-yard field goal to make the score 27–10, but a Bulger pass was intercepted by rookie cornerback, Dominique Rodgers-Cromartie, for 99 yards, for the touchdown that sealed the game and propelled the Cardinals to their first playoff game since 1998, and their first division title since the days the Cardinals were in St. Louis in 1975.

With the win, the Cardinals record improved to 8–5.

Week 15: vs. Minnesota Vikings

The Cardinals dueled with the Minnesota Vikings for the #3 seed in the NFC playoffs. Things looked bleak for the Cardinals from the beginning. The Vikings began their first quarter attack with an 82-yard punt return for a TD by Bernard Berrian. Two turnovers for the Cardinals, Kurt Warner interception and an Anquan Boldin fumble, would lead to two touchdown passes from Tarvaris Jackson, a 41-yard pass to Berrian and a 19-yard pass to Sidney Rice. The Vikings took a 28–0 lead at halftime after an 11-yard TD pass from Jackson to Chester Taylor. The Cardinals would rally to cut the lead in half with a Jerheme Urban 50-yard TD catch and a field goal blocked by Dominique Rodgers-Cromartie and recovered by Roderick Hood, who returned it 68 yards for a touchdown. The Vikings would pull away at the end of the third quarter when Jackson threw a 59-yard TD pass to Bobby Wade.

With the loss, the Cardinals dropped to 8–6.

Kurt Warner was benched on the Cardinals last drive in the fourth quarter via a coaching decision.

Week 16: at New England Patriots

Hoping to rebound from their home loss to the Vikings, the Cardinals flew to Gillette Stadium for a Week 16 interconference duel with the New England Patriots. Arizona would trail early in the first quarter as Patriots running back LaMont Jordan got a one-yard and a three-yard touchdown run. The Cardinals' east coast struggles continued in the second quarter as quarterback Matt Cassel completed a 15-yard touchdown pass to running back Kevin Faulk and an 11-yard touchdown pass to wide receiver Wes Welker, followed by kicker Stephen Gostkowski's 38-yard field goal.

In the third quarter, Arizona's deficit continued to climb as Cassel completed a 76-yard touchdown pass to wide receiver Randy Moss, followed by Gostkowski's 35- and 24-yard field goals. In the fourth quarter, New England concluded its domination with Gostkowski's 30-yard field goal. The Cardinals would then get a meaningless touchdown as quarterback Matt Leinart completed a 78-yard touchdown pass to wide receiver Larry Fitzgerald.

With the loss, Arizona fell to 8–7.

Original starting quarterback Kurt Warner (6/18 for 30 yards) was pulled in the third quarter via coach's decision.

Week 17: vs. Seattle Seahawks

Hoping to close out the regular season on a positive note, the Cardinals went home for a Week 17 NFC West rematch with the Seattle Seahawks. Arizona would trail early in the first quarter as Seahawks running back T. J. Duckett got a one-yard touchdown run. The Cardinals would respond in the second quarter with quarterback Kurt Warner completing a 16-yard touchdown pass to wide receiver Jerheme Urban and a five-yard touchdown pass to wide receiver Larry Fitzgerald. Seattle would tie the game at halftime with quarterback Seneca Wallace completing a 30-yard touchdown pass to wide receiver Deion Branch.

Arizona would regain the lead in the third quarter as Warner completed a 38-yard touchdown pass to Fitzgerald and a 14-yard touchdown pass to wide receiver Steve Breaston. Seattle tried to rally in the fourth quarter as Wallace completed a two-yard touchdown pass to Branch, yet the Cardinals would close out the game with kicker Neil Rackers nailing 23 and 32-yard field goals.

With the win, the Cardinals closed out the regular season at 9–7, and swept the NFC West for the first time in franchise history.

Playoffs
The Cardinals had a total of 5 players selected to the 2009 Pro Bowl. On offense, Kurt Warner was the starting quarterback, with Larry Fitzgerald and Anquan Boldin both at wide receiver. On defense, Adrian Wilson went as one of the conference's defensive backs. Sean Morey would be start on special teams.

Schedule

NFC Wild Card round: vs. Atlanta Falcons

Entering the playoffs at the NFC's fourth seed, the Cardinals began their playoff run at home against the #5 Atlanta Falcons, in their first home playoff game since 1947 and their first in Arizona.

Arizona got the early lead in the first quarter as quarterback Kurt Warner completed a 42-yard touchdown pass to wide receiver Larry Fitzgerald. The Falcons responded with kicker Jason Elam's 30-yard field goal, yet the Cardinals struck right back as Warner completed a 71-yard touchdown pass to wide receiver Anquan Boldin. Boldin pulled his hamstring running down the sideline and did not return. Atlanta took the halftime lead with running back Michael Turner getting a seven-yard touchdown run, followed by quarterback Matt Ryan completing a two-yard touchdown pass to tight end Justin Peelle following a Kurt Warner interception.

Arizona regained the lead in the third quarter as safety Antrel Rolle returned a Turner fumble 27 yards for a touchdown, while rookie running back Tim Hightower got a four-yard touchdown run. The Cardinals increased their lead in the fourth quarter as defensive end Antonio Smith sacked Ryan in his own endzone for a safety. The Falcons tried to come back as Ryan completed a five-yard touchdown pass to wide receiver Roddy White, yet Arizona's offense drained any second that Atlanta needed to rally. The Cardinals ended any chance the Falcons had for a comeback when Kurt Warner hooked up with tight end Stephen Spach for 23 yards on a third and sixteen with 2:16 left in the game.

With the win, the Cardinals improved their overall record to 10–7.

NFC Divisional Round: at Carolina Panthers

Coming off their wild card home win over the Falcons, the Cardinals flew to Bank of America Stadium for the NFC Divisional round against the #2 Carolina Panthers, in a rematch of their Week 8 contest. The Panthers came in 8–0 at home and the Cardinals were 0–5 on the East Coast.

Arizona would trail early in the first quarter as Panthers running back Jonathan Stewart scored on a nine-yard touchdown run. The Cardinals would respond with quarterback Kurt Warner completing a three-yard touchdown pass to rookie running back Tim Hightower, followed by running back Edgerrin James' four-yard touchdown run. In the second quarter, Arizona took control as kicker Neil Rackers made a 49-yard and then a 30-yard field goal, followed by Warner's 29-yard touchdown pass to wide receiver Larry Fitzgerald.

The Cardinals would add onto their lead in the third quarter as Rackers made a 33-yard field goal. In the fourth quarter, Arizona would end its dominating night with Rackers nailing a 20-yard field goal. Carolina would end the game's scoring with quarterback Jake Delhomme's eight-yard touchdown pass to wide receiver Steve Smith (with a failed two-point conversion.)

With this upset win, not only did the Cardinals improve their overall record to 11–7, but they also advanced to their first NFC Championship Game in franchise history.

Arizona's defense forced Delhomme into six turnovers (five interceptions and one fumble), along with holding the Panthers' running back duo of Williams and Stewart to 74 combined rushing yards.

Fitzgerald (8 receptions and a touchdown) would set a franchise postseason record with 166 receiving yards. Anquan Boldin did not play due to a hamstring injury, but Fitzgerald was able to make up the difference.

With the win the Cardinals moved to 11–7. Because the Eagles won the next day, Arizona hosted the NFC Championship Game. The Cardinals also won their first game on the East Coast this season.

NFC Championship: vs. Philadelphia Eagles

Coming off their east-coast divisional road win over the Panthers, the Cardinals went home for the NFC Championship Game against the #6 Philadelphia Eagles, who were coming off their victory over the #1 New York Giants, in a rematch of their Thanksgiving game.

Arizona capped off the game's opening kickoff with a nine-yard touchdown pass from quarterback Kurt Warner to wide receiver Larry Fitzgerald. The Eagles responded with kicker David Akers making a 45-yard field goal. With the score at 7–3, Akers missed a 47-yard field goal attempt, the first he missed in his last 20 attempts in the postseason, an NFL Record. The Cardinals answered in the second quarter as Warner hooked up with Fitzgerald again on a flea-flicker, Warner to Arrington, back to Warner, who threw it to Fitzgerald for a 62-yard TD pass. Philadelphia struck back as Akers made a 33-yard field goal, but Arizona closed out the half with Warner's one-yard touchdown pass to Fitzgerald and kicker Neil Rackers' 49-yard field goal in the final seconds of the half to make the score 24–6.

The Eagles began to rally in the third quarter as quarterback Donovan McNabb completed a six-yard and a 31-yard touchdown pass to tight end Brent Celek with a failed PAT on the latter touchdown. In the fourth quarter, Philadelphia took the lead on 62-yard touchdown pass from McNabb to rookie wide receiver DeSean Jackson. The Eagles went for the two-point conversion, hoping for a three-point lead, but failed, leaving the score 25–24. However, the Cardinals regained the lead when Warner completed an eight-yard touchdown pass to rookie running back Tim Hightower and a successful two-point conversion pass by Warner to tight end Ben Patrick. The Arizona defense was able to prevent Philadelphia from making a comeback, as the Eagles drove to the Arizona 47, but then McNabb threw four straight incompletions to turn the ball over on downs. The Cardinals went three and out on the next possession, giving the Eagles only seven seconds in the game, but the Eagles were unable to score on a 93-yard hook and ladder play after McNabb completed to Jackson, who attempted to lateral, but the lateral was picked off by defensive lineman Darnell Dockett.

The Cardinals improved their overall record to 12–7, and also won their first National Football Conference crown, allowing them to advance to their first Super Bowl appearance in franchise history. They became the first team since the 1979 Los Angeles Rams to finish the regular season with 9 wins and make it to the Super Bowl.

Fitzgerald had a stellar performance with 152 yards and three of Arizona's four touchdowns and setting a new postseason record with 419 receiving yards, surpassing the prior record set by Jerry Rice in 1988.

Super Bowl XLIII: vs. Pittsburgh Steelers

Two weeks following their NFC Championship victory over the Eagles, the Cardinals flew to Tampa, Florida for their Super Bowl XLIII duel with the AFC Champion Pittsburgh Steelers at Raymond James Stadium. Arizona would trail early in the first quarter as Steelers kicker Jeff Reed got an 18-yard field goal. The Steelers would add onto their lead as running back Gary Russell got a one-yard touchdown run. The Cardinals would answer with quarterback Kurt Warner completing a one-yard touchdown pass to tight end Ben Patrick. Arizona came close to scoring again nearing the end of the half, but Pittsburgh linebacker James Harrison returned an interception 100 yards for a touchdown.

The Steelers would increase their lead in the third quarter as Reed nailed a 21-yard field goal. In the fourth quarter, the Cardinals would take the lead as Warner completed a one-yard touchdown pass to wide receiver Larry Fitzgerald, Steelers center Justin Hartwig being called for holding in his own endzone (giving Arizona a safety), and Warner hooking up with Fitzgerald again on a 64-yard touchdown pass. However, Pittsburgh responded with quarterback Ben Roethlisberger completing a six-yard touchdown pass to wide receiver Santonio Holmes. The Cardinals tried to come back, but the Steelers' defense forced a fumble to seal the win.

With the loss, Arizona closed out their season with an overall record of 12–8.

References

Arizona
Arizona Cardinals seasons
National Football Conference championship seasons
NFC West championship seasons
Arizona